Buket (born 1983) is an American graffiti artist.

Buket may also refer to:

 Buket (grape), German wine grape
 Būket, an alternative name of Bukat, Iran
Buket Atalay (born 1990), Turkish female Paralympian goalball player
Buket Bengisu (born 1978), Turkish female singer
Buket Uzuner (born 1955), Turkish female writer

See also
 Bucket (disambiguation)
 Bouquet (disambiguation)
 Boquet (disambiguation)
 Bokeh (disambiguation)
 Boke (disambiguation)